Garrett Groshek (born August 2, 1997) is an American football running back for the Pittsburgh Maulers of the United States Football League (USFL). He played college football at Wisconsin.

Profesional career

Las Vegas Raiders
Groshek was signed by the Las Vegas Raiders after going undrafted on May 7, 2021. He was waived on August 31, 2021.

Minnesota Vikings
On November 16, 2021 the Minnesota Vikings signed Groshek to the practice squad. On November 23, 2021 he was released from the practice squad.

Pittsburgh Maulers
Groshek was selected in the 27th round of the 2022 USFL Draft by the Pittsburgh Maulers.

References

1997 births
Living people
American football running backs
Pittsburgh Maulers (2022) players
Players of American football from Wisconsin